Anders Due Hansen (born 17 March 1982) is a retired Danish footballer who currently is the assistant manager of Nykøbing FC. He played as a left midfielder and is the cousin of Danish national team and former Bolton, Charlton and Fulham midfielder, Claus Jensen.

Club career
Born in Nykøbing Falster, Due started playing football at Stubbekøbing Boldklub, but like many promising youngsters from Lolland and Falster switched to Nykøbing Falster Alliancen.

Nykøbing Falster Alliancen
Due started playing for Nykøbing Falster Allicancen (NFA) as a child, having almost his entire football upbringing at the club. Initially used as a left back, he later switched to the left midfield where his brilliant left foot helped crossing to the strikers. He started his professional career at the club in 2002, playing in the lower divisions of Danish football. He helped the club win several promotions up through the Danish football hierarchy. In 2004 Due signed a contract extension to 2006 along with fellow NFA youngster Anton Smedegaard.

During the 2004–05 season, Due scored 10 goals, 8 of which were from direct free kicks. As his contract with NFA was running out and with many good displays in the first division, Due had attracted the attention of clubs from the Danish Superliga, especially AGF, Brøndby IF and FC Nordsjælland. In the end he chose FC Nordsjælland, a club with an excellent record of picking good players from first division and turning them into quality players.

FC Nordsjælland
After arriving Due quickly replaced the injury plagued Henrik Eggerts as the first choice on the left midfield at FC Nordsjælland. Due had an astonishing beginning in FC Nordsjælland making 12 assists and scoring twice. Because of this Due was selected for the Danish Superliga Team of the fall 2006. The remaining part of the season was not as successful, but Due still managed to lead the most assist table by the end of the season, with a total of 15 assists.

Vitesse
After only one season at FC Nordsjælland, Due was headhunted by Vitesse Arnhem, who previously signed his teammate, Mads Junker. Vitesse, while scouting Junker, had noticed that Due was making most of the assists and decided to pay the 10 million DKK, approx 1.34 million Euro, price tag. Despite initial statements from the FC Nordsjælland owner, Allan K. Pedersen, denying the transfer, Due officially signed a four-year contract with Vitesse on 5 July 2006.

Due success during the first season in Vitesse was limited though, making only 17 appearances out of which only 7 were full matches. During the end of the 2006–07 season, Due told the media that he would most likely be leaving the Vitesse during the summer transfer window, citing Brøndby IF as the most likely destination. Having played in only 17 matches, he was unhappy with the lack of first team football. However, after talks with the manager, he announced that he would stay as the manager had explained that the club saw him as a great player for the future season.

FC Vestsjælland
On 10 June 2014, Due signed a three-year contract with FC Vestsjælland, at the age of 32. After the signing, FCVs sports director pronounced that he was hoping that Anders Due, could be a culture bearer for the club.

Nykøbing FC
On 11 January 2016, it was confirmed, that Due had signed with his former club Nykøbing FC.

International career
In his first season in the Superliga, Due established himself as one of the best wingers of the league. In January 2006, he was a part of national team manager Morten Olsen's Danish league national team, a representation team under the Danish FA consisting of players from the domestic Superliga. He played three unofficial international matches for the league national team at the 2006 Lunar New Year Cup, and scored a goal in the 3–0 victory against Hong Kong.

Because of his good displays during the USA trip, he was called up for the friendly against Paraguay on 27 May 2006 and France on 31 May 2006 as a replacement for Peter Løvenkrands. Due remained on the bench in both games as an unused substitute.

Coaching career
After retiring at the end of the 2017/18 season, Due continued at Nykøbing FC as an individual coach. In the following season, he was promoted to assistant manager of the newly appointed manager Brian Rasmussen.

External links
 Danish national team profile

References

1982 births
Living people
Danish men's footballers
Nykøbing FC players
FC Nordsjælland players
SBV Vitesse players
AaB Fodbold players
FC Vestsjælland players
Danish Superliga players
Eredivisie players
Danish expatriate men's footballers
Expatriate footballers in the Netherlands
Danish expatriate sportspeople in the Netherlands
Association football wingers
People from Guldborgsund Municipality
Sportspeople from Region Zealand